Jürgen Kaube (born 19 June 1962) is a German journalist and one of four editors-at large of the leading german conservative newspaper Frankfurter Allgemeine Zeitung (FAZ).

Life and journalism

Kaube was born 1962 in the Westgerman town of Worms and studied philosophy at the Free University Berlin. He was an assistant of Niklas Luhmann.
Kaube works as a journalist since 1992 and became an editor-at large for culture of the FAZ in 2015.

References 

Living people
1962 births
21st-century German journalists
Frankfurter Allgemeine Zeitung people